Love for Sale is an album by the Great Jazz Trio; pianist Hank Jones, bassist Buster Williams and drummer Tony Williams, recorded in 1976 for the Japanese East Wind label.

Reception

Allmusic awarded the album 3 stars, stating: "this swinging but unsurprising session features boppish interpretations of six jazz standards."

Track listing
 "Love for Sale" (Cole Porter) - 7:00
 "Glad to Be Unhappy" (Lorenz Hart, Richard Rodgers) - 6:52
 "Gee, Baby, Ain't I Good to You" (Andy Razaf, Don Redman) - 6:44
 "Secret Love" (Paul Francis Webster, Sammy Fain) - 6:07
 "Someone to Watch Over Me" (George Gershwin, Ira Gershwin) - 6:22
 "Autumn Leaves" (Jacques Prévert, Joseph Kosma) - 5:50
 "Tenderly" (Jack Lawrence, Walter Gross) - 6:02 Bonus track on CD reissue

Personnel 
Hank Jones - piano
Buster Williams - bass
Tony Williams - drums

References 

1976 albums
Great Jazz Trio albums
East Wind Records albums